The 2022 Canadian Mixed Doubles Curling Olympic Trials, also known as the Canad Inns Canadian Mixed Doubles Trials, was scheduled to be held from December 28, 2021, to January 2, 2022, at Stride Place in Portage la Prairie, Manitoba. The winners of this event were to represent Canada at the 2022 Winter Olympics. On December 26, 2021, it was announced that the event would be cancelled due to the spread of the COVID-19 pandemic in Canada.

On January 13, 2022, Curling Canada with consultation from the Canadian Olympic Committee and Own the Podium decided to pick the team of Rachel Homan and John Morris to represent Canada at the Olympics.

Qualification process
Teams qualified for these Olympics Trials through one of the following qualification methods:

Teams

The teams are listed as follows:

Round robin standings

Round robin results

All draw times are listed in Central Time (UTC−06:00).

Draw 1
Tuesday, December 28, 9:00 am

Draw 2
Tuesday, December 28, 12:30 pm

Draw 3
Tuesday, December 28, 4:00 pm

Draw 4
Tuesday, December 28, 7:30 pm

Draw 5
Wednesday, December 29, 9:00 am

Draw 6
Wednesday, December 29, 12:30 pm

Draw 7
Wednesday, December 29, 4:00 pm

Draw 8
Wednesday, December 29, 7:30 pm

Draw 9
Thursday, December 30, 9:00 am

Draw 10
Thursday, December 30, 12:30 pm

Draw 11
Thursday, December 30, 4:00 pm

Draw 12
Thursday, December 30, 7:30 pm

Draw 13
Friday, December 31, 9:00 am

Draw 14
Friday, December 31, 12:30 pm

Championship round

Semifinals
Friday, December 31, 4:00 pm

Finals
Saturday, January 1, 11:30 am

Playoffs

1 vs. 2
Saturday, January 1, 4:30 pm

3 vs. 4
Saturday, January 1, 4:30 pm

Semifinal
Sunday, January 2, 9:30 am

Final
Sunday, January 2, 1:30 pm

Notes

References

External links

Canadian Olympic Curling Trials
2021 in Canadian curling
2022 in Canadian curling
Canadian 2022
December 2021 sports events in Canada
January 2022 sports events in Canada
Curling at the 2022 Winter Olympics
Sport in Portage la Prairie
Curling in Manitoba
2021 in Manitoba
2022 in Manitoba
Qualification for the 2022 Winter Olympics
Curling events cancelled due to the COVID-19 pandemic